Haizhu Square Station is an interchange station of Line 2 and Line 6 of the Guangzhou Metro. It started operations on 29 December 2002. It is situated underneath Guangzhou Qiyi Road, Yide Road and Taikang Road in Yuexiu District. It is near Haizhu Square, Guangzhou Hotel and Hotel Canton Landmark.

Station layout

Exits
The station has 7 exits, lettered A, B (B1 to B3) and D to F.

References

Railway stations in China opened in 2002
Guangzhou Metro stations in Yuexiu District